Luna Park was an amusement park near Porte Maillot in Paris, France from 1907 (or 1909) to 1931. Features of the park included a shoot-the-chutes ride, a scenic railway, "Le Chatouilleur" ("Diabolic wheels", a roller coaster-type ride in which people ride in a car that rocks as it is pulled up a mountain), a river ride through the mountain that was the base of the scenic railway, and a dance hall. An additional attraction was named the Brooklyn Bridge. Its operating hours were from 1:00 p.m. to midnight. 

In 1907, Théodore Vienne, a wealthy industrialist and sports entrepreneur from Roubaix, founded the Wonderland Français with Robert Coquelle and Victor Breyer, a sports stadium at Luna Park.  The New York Times reported in 1913:

Jack Johnson, heavyweight champion, was matched to-day to fight Frank Moran in this city during the second week of January, 1914, for the heavyweight championship of the world. Two clubs, the Nouveau Cirque and the Wonderland Francais, are now bidding for the match, and the decision will be made known Saturday.

The Nouveau Cirque, which holds its bouts at the Velodrome d'Hiver in Passy, will seat 30,000 people, and it has offered Johnson 50 percent of the gross receipts, with 25 percent for Moran. The Wonderland Club, which is under the control of Theodore Vienne, the leading fight promoter of France, will submit its bid tomorrow.  It is said that both parties favor Vienne's club, as the fight would be held in Luna Park, Paris, thereby drawing a great society crowd.

Waning popularity, in part due to the worsening global economic conditions, prompted the park ownership to purchase 25 embalmed whales and 100 live penguins for exhibit in 1931. The additional displays did not help: Luna Park closed in the autumn of the same year.

Notes

References

Event venues established in 1909
Amusement parks closed in 1931
Defunct amusement parks in France
Amusement parks in France
20th century in Paris
1907 establishments in France
1931 disestablishments in France
1909 establishments in France
Amusement parks opened in 1907